Wendy Anne Warren is an American historian. Her book New England Bound won a Merle Curti Award and was a finalist for the Pulitzer Prize for History. She is also an Associate professor of History at Princeton University.

Education
Warren was born and raised in San Diego, California. She attended Yale University for her Master's degree and PhD.

Career
Warren joined the faculty at Princeton University after completing a junior research fellowship at the University of Oxford. From 2014 until 2017, she held the university's Philip and Beulah Rollins Preceptorship in the Department of History. In her final year of the preceptorship, she published New England Bound: Slavery and Colonization in Early America through Boni & Liveright. The idea for the book came to her as a doctoral student at Yale, when she came across a 17th century account of the rape of a New England slave. It won the 2017 Merle Curti Award as the best book published in American social history and was a finalist for the Pulitzer Prize for History.

Following the publication of her book, Warren was promoted to Associate professor and received the Frederick Burkhardt Fellowship from the American Council of Learned Societies.

References

Living people
Writers from San Diego
Year of birth missing (living people)
Yale Graduate School of Arts and Sciences alumni
Princeton University faculty
American women historians
American women non-fiction writers
Historians from California
21st-century American women